Charles Ditchley, also known as Chucky Workclothes (born October 5, 1984) is an American hip-hop artist based out of Indianapolis, Indiana.

Early life
Since the start of his rap career in 2010, Chucky Workclothes established his own label, Express Life Entertainment recording "Express Life" Volumes 1, 2, and 3. He has become a well known and established artist in the local rap community.

In January 2014, he was signed to RBC Records for a two album release. The first of the two, "Country Boy Livin'" with Young Bleed was released in June 2014 and followed up with the "Country Boy Livin" Tour to promote the release.

"Tax Season", the second of the two releases, was to be his debut solo album via RBC Records and was released on August 24, 2015. The album features guest appearances from E-40, Pusha T, Kurupt, Young Buck, Young Bleed, Crooked I and more. He has also shared the stage with artist like Lil Wyte and JellyRoll, as well as toured with E-40 on his "Choices Tour".

He is currently working on a three part EP Series titled "Professor Works Laboratory", with the first installment scheduled to be released December 2015.

Discography

Studio albums
Tax Season - 2015

EP's
Professor Works Laboratory Vol. 1 - 2015
Professor Works Laboratory Vol. 2 - 2016
Professor Works Laboratory Vol. 3 - 2017
Professor Works Laboratory Vol. 4: The Shake Back - 2018

Collaboration albums
Country Boy Livin' (with Young Bleed) - 2014
Consistency Theory (with M7ofatc) - 2018
Consistency Theory II (with M7ofatc) - 2019

Mixtapes
Country Boy Livin' (Blend Tape) (with Young Bleed) - 2015

References

External links
 Official Website
 Chucky Workclothes on iTunes

1984 births
Living people
Midwest hip hop musicians
Musicians from Indianapolis
Rappers from Indiana
Underground rappers
21st-century American rappers